The École nationale supérieure d'arts de Paris Cergy is a National public school of art and design established in Cergy-Pontoise. It is one of the 5 National Art school in France, run by the French Ministry of Culture (France). Recognized as France's second best graduate school of arts, it delivers the DNSEP, Master's degree of Fine Arts, as well as Post Masters. It presents itself as a "laboratory for contemporary art" around dance studios, film, sound, video, painting, photography, drawing, writing, and multimedia.

It runs its own art gallery, Ygrec, located in Paris

It runs exchange programs with La Cambre in Brussels; Central Saint Martins, London; Otis College of Art and Design, Los Angeles; Royal Danish Academy of Fine Arts, Copenhagen, among others

Notable teachers 
François Bon
Geoffroy de Lagasnerie
Luc Lang
Orlan

Notable alumni 
Zoulikha Bouabdellah
Ronan & Erwan Bouroullec
Cyril Duval
Loris Gréaud
Emmanuel Guillaud
Michel Hazanavicius
Jean-Michel Othoniel
Eshel Meir

References 

Art schools in France
Cergy-Pontoise